The Minneapolis City Council is the lawmaking body of Minneapolis. It consists of 13 members, elected from separate wards to four-year terms, via a ranked-choice method. The council structure has been in place since the 1950s. In recent elections, council membership has been dominated by the Minnesota Democratic–Farmer–Labor Party (DFL). As of 2022, 12 members identified with the DFL, while one identified with Democratic Socialists of America. Until the 2021 Minneapolis City Council election, the city's government structure was considered a weak-mayor, strong-council system. However, a charter amendment was passed that gave the mayor more power and reduced the council to purely legislative duties.

History

The city has never had more than 13 wards, but at one time there were three representatives from each area, for a total of 39 members of the City Council. The City Council assumed its current size in the 1950s.

The Minneapolis City Council represents the city's thirteen districts called wards. The city adopted instant-runoff voting in 2006, first using it in the 2009 elections. The council has 12 DFL members and one from the Democratic Socialists of America. Election issues in 2013 included funding for a new Vikings stadium over which some incumbents lost their positions. That year, Minneapolis elected Abdi Warsame, Alondra Cano, and Blong Yang, the city's first Somali-American, Mexican-American, and Hmong-American city councilpeople, respectively.

The City Council passed a resolution in March 2015 making fossil fuel divestment city policy. With encouragement from city administration, Minneapolis joined seventeen cities worldwide in the Carbon Neutral Cities Alliance. The city's climate plan is to reduce greenhouse gas emissions 15 percent in 2015 "compared to 2006 levels, 30 percent by 2025 and 80 percent by 2050".

In 2018, the city council passed the Minneapolis Comprehensive 2040 Plan and submitted it for Metropolitan Council approval. Watched nationally, the plan rezones predominantly single-family residential neighborhoods for triplexes to increase affordable housing, seeks to reduce the effects of climate change, and tries to rectify some of the city's racial disparities. After the Metropolitan Council approved the plan, in November 2019 the city council voted unanimously to allow duplexes and triplexes citywide. The Brookings Institution called it "a relatively rare example of success for the YIMBY agenda" and "the most wonderful plan of the year."

Controversial incidents
In July 2001, DFL Council Member Brian Herron pleaded guilty to one count of felony extortion. Herron admitted to accepting a $10,000 bribe from business owner Selwin Ortega who faced numerous health and safety inspection violations at his Las Americas grocery stores. Herron served a one-year sentence in federal prison.

On November 21, 2002, ten-year DFL Council Member Joe Biernat was convicted of five federal felony charges, one count of embezzlement, three counts of mail fraud, and one count of making a false statement. Biernat was found not guilty on extortion and conspiracy to extort charges.

In September 2005, Green Party Council Member Dean Zimmermann was served with a federal search warrant to his home by the Federal Bureau of Investigation (FBI). The affidavit attached to the warrant revealed that the FBI had Zimmermann on video and audiotape accepting bribes for a zoning change. Zimmermann subsequently lost his re-election campaign, and was convicted in federal court on three counts of accepting cash from a developer and found not guilty of soliciting property from people with business with the city. Zimmermann was released from prison in July 2008.

In 2009, Council President Barbara A. Johnson was accused of misusing campaign funds for personal spending. An administrative hearing was held January 26, 2010. The administrative judges at the hearing dismissed six of the eight charges; it upheld two charges—that AAA services were paid for both her and her husband's vehicle and that not all charges for hairstyling or dry cleaning were reasonably related to the campaign. Johnson paid a $200 fine for these violations, the lowest fine possible.

In 2015, DFL Council Member Alondra Cano used her Twitter account to publish private cellphone numbers and e-mail addresses of critics who wrote about her involvement in a Black Lives Matter rally.

In 2020, after the murder of George Floyd, nine city council members announced their highly controversial goals to disband the Minneapolis Police Department. Their plan included amending the city's charter to remove the requirement for a minimum number of officers, along with replacing the MPD with a broader public safety agency. The City Council was then discovered to have been utilizing private security at a cost of $4,500 per day for three of their members. In the end, the plan made it to the ballot in 2021, but ended up failing with only 43% of votes in support of it; along with six of the nine city council members who wanted to get rid of the police either voted out or having not ran for reelection.

In 2021, while leaving a Pride Day event, a car containing Council Vice President Andrea Jenkins was surrounded by protesters who blocked her from leaving until she signed a list of demands, which included not interfering with the occupied George Floyd Square and the resignation of Mayor Jacob Frey. Jenkins was stuck for over 90 minutes before signing the list so she could go.

In July 2022, City Council Member Michael Rainville said during a meeting with his constituents that he was going to go to a mosque in Northeast Minneapolis to "meet with Somali elders and tell them that their children can no longer have that kind of behavior," in response to incidents on the 4th of July in Downtown Minneapolis, in which groups of people were seen launching fireworks at buildings and other people. His comments drew criticism, including from fellow City Council Members, who attempted to censure him. Jamal Osman, Jeremiah Ellison, and Aisha Chughtai, the City Council's three Muslim members, issued a statement calling Rainville's comments "incorrect," "inappropriate," "disturbing," and "dangerous." Rainville has since apologized for the comments.

Electoral system
In 2006, Minneapolis voters approved the use of the single transferable vote for its municipal elections. The first use of ranked-choice voting was in the 2009 municipal election. However, since the City Council uses single-member districts, the single transferable vote functions the same way as instant-runoff voting. This system of voting is commonly known in the United States as ranked choice voting.

Each member's term is normally four years, and there are no limits on the number of terms a member may serve. In 2020, however, voters approved a plan to amend the city charter to establish city council elections in 2021 and 2023 for two-year terms instead of the regular four-year terms, with four-year term elections restarting in 2025. The amendment also granted the ability for the city to use this method whenever regular city council elections do not fall in a year ending in a 3 in order to comply with a state law designed to require city council elections in years ending in 2 or 3 after a census.

Salary
Council Members have a base salary of $106,101 in 2021. Raises for council members and the mayor are based on "averaging out the increases included in the union contracts they approved the previous year." In 2018, all Council Members were paid a base salary of $98,696 annually, plus mileage, free parking, and the usual employee benefits.  This salary included an increase of $10,000 approved in late 2017.

Members, 2022–current
Election results according to preliminary results by Minneapolis Election and Voter Services. Political parties are shown as presented in the Star Tribune voter guide, with corrections based on candidate's campaign webpages.

Members, 2018–2021

Standing Committees
In response to the COVID-19 pandemic, the City Council on March 27, 2020, reorganized its committee structure, suspending its existing committees and creating two committees in their place. The stated goals of this restructuring are to be more flexible and responsive during the city's public health emergency, give city departments more time to plan and prepare agenda items to be presented to the City Council, and expedite processing and publication of City Council decisions. These changes are intended to be in effect for the duration of the public health emergency.

On May 22, 2020, the City Council revised its committee structure to enable the previously suspended Budget Committee to meet as needed. On August 28, 2020, the City Council further revised its committee structure, adding a new committee and enabling the previously suspended Transportation and Public Works Committee to meet again.

See also
Government of Minneapolis

Notes

References

External links
 

Minnesota city councils
City Council